Jeanne d'Arc de Vichy-Clermont Métropole was a professional basketball club based in Vichy, France. The club played their home games at both Maison des Sports de Clermont-Ferrand and Palais des Sports de Vichy. In 2015, JA Vichy and Stade Clermontois Basket Auvergne merged to form a new team called JA Vichy-Clermont for the 2015–16 season.

Honours

Domestic competitions
 French Cup 
 Winners (2): 1969, 1970
 Leaders Cup
 Runners-up (1): 2008

European competitions
 FIBA Saporta Cup
 Runners-up (1): 1969–70

Players

Notable players

References

External links
Official site 
Team profile at Eurobasket.com

Defunct basketball teams in France
Basketball teams established in 1933
Basketball teams disestablished in 2015